Chandiborpur Union is an Union parishad of Narail Sadar Upazila, Narail District in Khulna Division of Bangladesh. It has an area of 45.04 km2 (17.39 sq mi) and a population of 24,745.

References

Unions of Narail Sadar Upazila